Fairhall is a locality in Marlborough, New Zealand. Blenheim is about 7.5 km to the northeast. The Fairhall River runs past to the west.

The river and locality were named in 1847 for a chainman in a survey team in the area.

Demographics

Fairhall, including the subdivision of Marlborough Ridge, had a population of 456 at the 2018 New Zealand census, an increase of 78 people (20.6%) since the 2013 census, and an increase of 165 people (56.7%) since the 2006 census. There were 186 households. There were 225 males and 234 females, giving a sex ratio of 0.96 males per female, with 63 people (13.8%) aged under 15 years, 42 (9.2%) aged 15 to 29, 216 (47.4%) aged 30 to 64, and 138 (30.3%) aged 65 or older.

Ethnicities were 95.4% European/Pākehā, 3.3% Māori, 1.3% Asian, and 2.6% other ethnicities (totals add to more than 100% since people could identify with multiple ethnicities).

Although some people objected to giving their religion, 46.7% had no religion, 44.7% were Christian, 0.7% were Hindu and 2.6% had other religions.

Of those at least 15 years old, 138 (35.1%) people had a bachelor or higher degree, and 54 (13.7%) people had no formal qualifications. The employment status of those at least 15 was that 207 (52.7%) people were employed full-time and 69 (17.6%) were part-time.

Education
Fairhall School is a coeducational full primary (years 1-8) school with a roll of  The school opened in 1877.

References

Populated places in the Marlborough Region